Laughin' to Keep from Cryin' is a 1958 studio album by Lester Young featuring the trumpeters Harry "Sweets" Edison and Roy Eldridge.

Reception

Scott Yanow reviewed the album for Allmusic and wrote that "...this date apparently had a lot of difficulties but the recorded results are excellent. Young takes rare clarinet solos on two of the selections with his emotional statement on "They Can't Take That Away from Me" being one of the highpoints of his career."

Track listing 
 "Salute to Benny" (Lester Young) - 8:32
 "They Can't Take That Away from Me" (George Gershwin, Ira Gershwin) - 6:02
 "Romping" (Young) - 11:42
 "The Gypsy in My Soul" (Clay Boland, Moe Jaffe) - 4:14
 "Please Don't Talk About Me When I'm Gone" (Sidney Clare, Sam H. Stept) - 6:11
 Ballad medley: "The Very Thought of You"/"I Want a Little Girl"/"Blue and Sentimental" (Ray Noble)/(Murray Mencher, Billy Moll)/(Count Basie, Jerry Livingston, Mack David) - 6:38
 "Mean to Me" (Fred E. Ahlert, Roy Turk) - 6:58

Personnel 
 Lester Young - clarinet, tenor saxophone
 Harry "Sweets" Edison, Roy Eldridge - trumpet
 Herb Ellis - guitar
 Hank Jones - piano
 George Duvivier - double bass
 Mickey Sheen - drums

Production
 Sherniece Smith - art coordinator
 Hollis King, Sheldon Marks - art direction
 Francis Davis - liner notes
 JoDee Stringham - design
 Kevin Reeves - mastering
 Peter Keepnews - notes editing
 Cynthia Sesso - photo research
 Burt Goldblatt - photography
 Norman Granz - producer
 Tom Greenwood - production assistant, research assistant

References

1958 albums
Albums produced by Norman Granz
Lester Young albums
Verve Records albums